Felicia fruticosa is a strongly branching shrub of up to  high that is assigned to the family Asteraceae with flower heads consisting of about twenty purple to white ray florets encircling many yellow disc florets, and small flat, entire and hairless leathery leaves. Two subspecies are recognized. It is sometimes called bosastertjie in Afrikaans. In the wild, flower occurs from August till October.

Description 
The trunk and side branches have fibrous, peeling, greyish brown bark, and end in young, non-flowering long shoots. In the leaf axils of the two-year-old and older long shoots are moderately branching short shoots with one to three floral heads each. The flat surface is hairless and indistinctly spotted by round resin glands lying in the leaf blade. The broadened leaf base slightly runs down the stem, and is hairless or has a ciliate margin and has woolly hairs in the axil.

The floral heads are medium in size. In subsp. brevipedunculata, the heads are practically without stalk and sit directly in the rosette of the short shoots.

In the middle of each disc floret, the five anthers are merged into a tube through which the style grows when the floret opens. At the tip of both of the style branches is narrow triangular appendage.

Felicia fruticosa is a diploid having nine sets of homologue chromosomes (2n=18).

Differences between the subspecies 
The heads are practically without stalk and sit directly in the rosette of the short shoots.

Taxonomy 
This species was first described from the Cape by Carl Linnaeus in 1764 as Aster fruticosus. In 1803, Carl Ludwig Willdenow invalidly changed the name to Aster fruticulosus. In 1828, Henri Cassini described another specimen as Diplostephium longipes. When Christian Friedrich Lessing reassigned Linnaeus's species, he maintained Willdenow's change, calling the species Diplopappus fruticulosus. Nees von Esenbeck also kept the invalid name, when he moved it again, creating the combination Diplostephium fruticulosum in 1833. In the same publication he also described Diplostephium extenuatum, which was reassigned by Augustin Pyramus de Candolle, who made the name Diplopappus extenuatus in 1836. George Nicholson proposed to include the species in the genus Felicia and so made the combination that is currently in use: Felicia fruticosa. Margaret Levyns published a correction of Lessing's error in 1948, making the combination Diplopappus fruticosus. In 1973 Jürke Grau considered all these names synonymous.

The subspecies from the Limpopo Province was initially described by John Hutchinson as Aster brevipedunculatus in 1931. Grau changed its status in 1973 to Felicia fruticosa subsp. brevipedunculatus.

Felicia fruticosa is the type species of the section Lignofelicia.

The species name fruticosa is a Latin word meaning "shrubby".

Distribution 
Felicia fruticosa subsp. fruticosa is an endemic of the Cape Peninsula and the surroundings of Stellenbosch.

Conservation 
The continued survival of both subspecies of Felicia fruticosa is considered to be of least concern because their populations are stable.

References

External links 
 line drawing of Felicia fruticosa subsp. fruticosa
 distribution maps of both subspecies
 photos of Felicia fruticosa subsp. fruticosa on iNaturalist

fruticosa
Plants described in 1764
Taxa named by Carl Linnaeus
Endemic flora of South Africa